Niccolo Guglielmo Alforae was a French engraver of the Baroque period, active in Rome. He was a native of Lorraine, but resided in Rome. There is a set of twelve small upright prints of flowers. They are inscribed Nicholaus Gulielmus Alforae Lotharingus fecit, Romae.

Sources

Italian engravers
French engravers
People from Lorraine